Jennie Loriston-Clarke MBE (born 22 January 1943) is a British equestrian. She competed at the 1972, 1976, 1984 and the 1988 Summer Olympics. After her riding career, Loriston-Clarke was active as an international Eventing and Dressage judge on 4* level and is now still active as Technical Delegate.

Biography
Loriston-Clarke was born in Charmouth, England, in 1943.

From 1972 to 1988, she competed at four Olympic Games, only missing the 1980 Summer Olympics in Moscow. Her best individual performance was 14th place in the dressage at the 1988 Summer Olympics in Seoul, South Korea. She retired from competition in 1995.

In 1979, Loriston-Clarke was awarded with an MBE for her services to equestrianism, and in 2006 she became the first person to be awarded with the Queen's Award for Equestrianism.

Loriston-Clarke's sister, Jane and brother Michael have also represented Great Britain at the Olympics in equestrian events.

References

External links
 

1943 births
Living people
British female equestrians
British dressage riders
Olympic equestrians of Great Britain
Equestrians at the 1972 Summer Olympics
Equestrians at the 1976 Summer Olympics
Equestrians at the 1984 Summer Olympics
Equestrians at the 1988 Summer Olympics
Sportspeople from Dorset